Make Some Noise is the second official studio EP by the English progressive rock band Big Big Train. It was released on 23 September 2013 by English Electric Recordings and Burning Shed. It contains four new tracks from the compilation album English Electric: Full Power, plus a selection of tracks from English Electric Part One and English Electric Part Two, two of which (“Keeper of Abbeys” and “Curator of Butterflies”) are edited versions.

Track listing

Make some noise, Seen Better Days, Edgelands and The Lovers: new tracks, not included in English Electric Part One and Two

Personnel
Nick D'Virgilio –  drums, cajon, backing vocals
Dave Gregory – 6 and 12 string electric guitars, electric sitar
David Longdon –  lead vocals, flute, acoustic guitar, banjo, accordion, melodica, keyboards, vibraphone, tambourine, dumbek, the birds and the bees
Danny Manners – keyboards, double bass, baritone bee
Andy Poole –  electric piano, acoustic guitar, backing vocals
Gregory Spawton –  bass guitar, 6 and 12 string acoustic guitars, mandolin, backing vocals

Guest musicians
 Lily Adams – backing vocals, soprano bee
 Violet Adams – backing vocals, soprano bee
 Robin Armstrong – backing vocals
 Geraldine Berreen – violin
 Sue Bowran – violin
 Dave Desmond – trombone
 Ben Godfrey – cornet
 Rachel Hall – violin
 Lord Cornelius Plum – backwards guitar
 John Storey – euphonium
 Abigail Trundle – cello
 Jon Truscott – tuba
 Teresa Whipple – viola
 String arrangement on Leopards by Louis Phillipe
 Brass arrangement on Curator of Butterflies by Dave Desmond
 String arrangement on Curator of Butterflies by Dave Gregory
 Mixing and mastering by Rob Aubrey at Aubitt Studios

External links
Progarchives 
Liner notes

References

Big Big Train albums
2013 EPs